The 1979 Salvadoran coup d’état was a military coup d'état that occurred in El Salvador on 15 October 1979. The coup, led by young military officers, bloodlessly overthrew military President Carlos Humberto Romero and sent him into exile. The National Conciliation Party's firm grasp on power was cut, and in its place, the military established the Revolutionary Government Junta of El Salvador (JRG). The junta was composed of two military officers and three civilians. 

The Revolutionary Government Junta declared itself to be a "reformist junta" which would pass political and economic reforms. In reality, it continued to crack down on political opposition, especially after the rise of several leftist militant groups in the early 1980s. The coup is commonly cited as the beginning of the twelve year-long Salvadoran Civil War.

Background 

The National Conciliation Party (PCN) had held a firm grasp on Salvadoran politics since the 1961 Salvadoran Constitutional Assembly election and the 1962 Salvadoran presidential election, following the dissolutions of both the Junta of Government in 1961 and the Civic-Military Directory in 1962. The PCN government was supported by the United States since its government style, a military dictatorship, was seen as "the most effective [way of] containing Communist penetration in Latin America." The Salvadoran National Guard was equipped and trained by the United States and the CIA, both of which directly supported the PCN regime.

Throughout the 1960s and 1970s, many political groups arose in opposition to the military government of the National Conciliation Party. The Christian Democratic Party (PDC) was the chief opponent of the PCN, gaining significant influence in the Legislative Assembly. In the 1972 presidential election, PDC candidate José Napoleón Duarte, under the banner of the National Opposing Union (UNO), was declared to have won the election by 6,000 votes by the Central Election Board, but the result was cancelled and the Legislative Assembly instead voted PCN candidate Arturo Armando Molina as president. Duarte was arrested, tortured, and exiled to Venezuela for his victory in the 1972 election.

Other, less political, groups which appeared included the United Front for Revolutionary Action (FUAR), Party of Renovation (PAR), Unitary Syndical Federation of El Salvador (FUSS), Unified Popular Action Front (FAPU), and the Christian Federation of Salvadoran Peasants (FECCAS). In order to combat the political and militant opposition to the government, President Julio Adalberto Rivera established the National Democratic Organization (ORDEN). The organization was headed by General José Alberto Medrano and placed under the administration of the National Security Agency of El Salvador (ANSESAL). ORDEN was a group of several government-controlled death squads which were used to arrest and torture political opponents, intimidate voters, rig elections, and kill peasants. ORDEN claimed to have somewhere between 50,000 and 100,000 members at its peak in the late 1960s. Some of the most notorious death squads included the Anti-Communist Armed Forces of Liberation – War of Elimination (FALANGE) and the White Warrior's Union (Mano Blanca).

The Football War between El Salvador and Honduras in July 1969 saw 300,000 Salvadoran refugees leave Honduras for safety in El Salvador. They increased rates of unemployment and crime, weakening the nation's economy. The refugees coming from Honduras overpopulated the already densely populated country. They lived in poverty and had to sustain themselves without any government assistance. The impoverished citizens supported opposition candidates in elections since the government did little to nothing to support them, but the results were always rigged by the government and the poor were harassed by ORDEN. The increase of impoverished Salvadorans in the nation allowed militant groups such as the Farabundo Martí People's Forces of Liberation (FPL), Communist Party of El Salvador (PCES), National Resistance (RN), and the People's Revolutionary Army (ERP) to grow in size and numbers.

In March 1979, President Carlos Humberto Romero attempted to negotiate with his political opponents due to the outbreak of the Nicaraguan Revolution the year prior, hoping to prevent a revolution against his own government. As a result, opposition forces, who saw weakness, organized strikes and marched in the streets of San Salvador and the crowds seized public buildings. Romero's soldiers crushed the strikes and marches by using live ammunition on the protesters. The event was broadcast across the United States and Europe and resulted in Costa Rica, Japan, Switzerland, the United Kingdom, and West Germany, closing their embassies in El Salvador citing an "uncontrollable spiral of violence."

Coup

Prelude and planning 

In July 1979, the regime of Anastasio Somoza Debayle was overthrown in the Nicaraguan Revolution and the Sandinistas gained power in Nicaragua. The event caused many military officials in El Salvador to fear that Romero's government would likely soon fall to the left-wing guerrilla forces with Sandinista support, and several military officers planned a coup to prevent El Salvador from "suffering the same fate as Nicaragua." The 800-strong officer corps of the military decided to act to remove Romero and install their own government with support from the United States.

Before the coup was staged, three different groups each started plotting their own coup attempts. In May 1979, Colonel Ernesto Clairmount, a Christian Democrat who was living in exile in Costa Rica, called for the army to overthrow Romero. Constitutionalists in the army under Colonel Adolfo Arnoldo Majano Ramos wanted to bring several economic and political reforms to El Salvador, while those with pro-US sympathies, who wanted moderate reforms and to crush left-wing organizations, supported Colonel Jaime Abdul Gutiérrez Avendaño. Meanwhile, oligarchs supported extreme reactionaries in the army to protect their own interests. According to the memoirs of Colonel Gutiérrez Avendaño, the coup was postponed three times. He claimed that Romero found out about the conspiracy but failed to take any serious action to prevent it.

Overthrow of Romero 

On 15 October 1979 at 8:15am local time, the group of military officers, called the Military Youth, rallied the Armed Forces of El Salvador to overthrow Romero's government. The armed forces were led by Colonels Majano Ramos and Gutiérrez Avendaño. The coup succeeded with no casualties and resulted in Romero's resignation. He was charged with corruption, electoral fraud, and human rights violations, but Romero fled for exile in Guatemala after negotiating a deal with the military to leave El Salvador by 6:30pm local time. Divisional General Federico Castillo Yanes (Minister of National Defense), and Colonels Antonio Corleto (Director of the National Guard), Antonio López (Director of the National Police), Oscar René Serrano (Director of the Treasury Police), and Roberto Santibáñez (Director of the Political Police) also left the country for exile.

In the wake of the coup, the military established the center-left wing Revolutionary Government Junta. The junta consisted of Colonels Majano Ramos and Gutiérrez Avendaño, and three civilians: Guillermo Manuel Ungo Revelo, Mario Antonio Andino, and Román Mayorga Quirós. Ungo Revelo was a democratic socialist politician who had opposed the PCN government in the 1970s, Andino was the ex-vice president of the Chamber of Commerce and Industry of El Salvador (CCIES), and Mayorga Quirós was a member of the Central American University. The Salvadoran National Guard supported the coup and most of its leadership became loyal to the junta. Brigadier General José Guillermo García was appointed to Minister of National Defense by the junta. 

The junta dissolved ORDEN which resulted in the death squads operating independently throughout what became the Salvadoran Civil War. The junta itself was the source of human rights violations such as mass murder, torture, executions, and unexplained disappearances. Despite dissolving ORDEN, the junta utilized its own death squads to commit the atrocities.

United States involvement 

The United States government took an active role in the coup. Plotters stated that they had first attained prior US approval for the coup. It is clear that the US was aware of the plan beforehand. The US had been Romero's biggest supporter, but by October 1979, the US decided it needed a regime change. The officers the US recruited promised reforms, political rights, and amnesty for all political prisoners. Following the coup, the United States immediately recognized the junta's legitimacy as the government of El Salvador. Under Jimmy Carter and Ronald Reagan, the junta and subsequent civilian government received massive aid and funding from the United States.

The coup was proclaimed as a "reformist coup" which established a "reformist junta," similar to the Military Revolutionary Council in South Vietnam during the 1963 South Vietnamese coup d'état which overthrew Ngô Đình Diệm. In both instances, the United States sent increased support to the new government.

The chairman of the junta, Majano Ramos, had left-leaning tendencies. The United States counted on right-leaning influence from Gutiérrez, and later Duarte, drowning out Majano Ramos' leftist influence. They eventually succeeded when Majano Ramos resigned as chairman and commander-in-chief in May 1980, and then from the junta entirely in December 1980. He was later arrested by the junta in February 1981 and left for exile in Panama in March 1981 after being released. His resignation allowed Gutiérrez Avendaño to become commander-in-chief and chairman of the junta in May 1980. He remained chairman and commander-in-chief until December 1980 when Duarte became president of the junta, where he remained until the 1982 presidential election.

Aftermath 

In the weeks directly following the coup, thousands of civilians marched in the streets of San Salvador. They occupied churches and gathered around government buildings, demanding that the junta release information of all those who had disappeared under the military regime. They also demanded the lowering of rent prices, a raise in wages, and the institute of land reform. Despite ORDEN being officially dissolved by the junta in October 1979, its former paramilitary forces continued to operate during the civil war. Archbishop Óscar Arnulfo Romero y Galdámez cautiously endorsed the junta which was established stating that the junta's goals of reform were good willed, but he warned that "beautiful promises are not dead letters."

The coup of 1979 allowed for the rise of militant left-wing groups in the country. The five largest groups, Farabundo Martí People's Forces of Liberation (FPL), Communist Party of El Salvador (PCES), National Resistance (RN), People's Revolutionary Army (ERP), and the Revolutionary Party of the Central American Workers – El Salvador (PRTC), joined forces on 10 October 1980, nearly one year after the coup, to form the Farabundo Martí National Liberation Front (FMLN), the most prominent opposition force to the Salvadoran government throughout the Salvadoran Civil War. The group was named after Augustín Farabundo Martí Rodríguez, the leader of the Communist Party during an uprising in 1932 which resulted in the massacre of 10,000 to 40,000 peasants under the rule of Maximiliano Hernández Martínez, who himself had a far-right death squad named after him.

During the rule of the junta from 1979 to 1982, around 20,000 Salvadoran civilians were killed, with human rights organizations estimating that up to 80% were killed directly by the junta. In 1980, the US-equipped National Guard massacred 300–600 civilians in Chalatenango, and in 1981, the US-trained Atlácatl Battalion massacred 800 civilians in the village of El Mozote. The junta denied the accusations of utilizing death squads to protect itself, instead claiming that it was a problem it could not control.  The resulting civil war killed anywhere from 70,000 to 80,000 people and lasted twelve years from 1979, starting with the coup, until 1992, with the signing of the Chapultepec Peace Accords.

The coup of 1979 was the last successful military coup in Salvadoran history.

See also 

List of Salvadoran coups d'état
Revolutionary Government Junta of El Salvador
Salvadoran Civil War

References 

1979 in El Salvador
Salvadoran Civil War
Military coups in El Salvador
1970s coups d'état and coup attempts
History of El Salvador
Cold War
Cold War in Latin America
Cold War conflicts